Dmitry Petrovich Voronenko (born July 29, 1971), known as The Petersburg Maniac, is a Kyrgyzstani-Ukrainian serial killer, who killed four girls and young women in St. Petersburg between 2006 and 2007.

Early life 
Voronenko was born in the Osh Region into the family of an electrician and a kindergarten teacher. In his childhood, he liked to choke cats and dogs. After graduating the 10th grade, he did not have a permanent job. In 1987, Voronenko moved to the Ukrainian city of Krivyi Rih, where he graduated from the vocational school for the welder specialty.

In 1989 Voronenko was sentenced to three years of correctional labor at construction sites in the Crimea for theft. Shortly before his release, he stole a bottle of brandy and a phone from his shift manager, for which he was added another two years of correctional labor. In 1997-1999, he received a suspended sentence on three occasions for "causing serious harm to health in excess of the limits of self-defense" and theft. In 2004, he was sentenced to five years in prison, serving his term in the Kresty Prison for two confirmed rapes in 2000 and 2001, most of the punishment being absorbed by the term of stay under investigation. In March 2005, just over three years and three months from the date of arrest, Voronenko was released on parole for good behaviour.

The rapist was to be deported to the place of citizenship - Ukraine, but the supervising authorities did not pay proper attention to Voronenko, so after his last arrest, numerous accusations were made against certain officials, but none were held viable as direct accomplices to the serial killer.

Murders 
Voronenko attacked girls and young women, preferring blondes, about 150 centimetres in height.

On August 25, 2006, he raped a 17-year-old girl on Loni Golikova Street. The victim managed to survive the ordeal.

On December 8, 2006, in the basement of a house on Stachek Avenue, he committed his first murder. The victim was 11-year-old Lida Pogodina, whom he raped, killed and then hid the body in a garbage heap.

On January 28, 2007 on Polyukstrovsky Avenue, he killed 19-year-old Katya Fedotova. As it later turned out, Voronenko had suggested that he take the woman to the bus. The girl's body was found only after a month.

On March 4, 2007, he raped and killed 20-year-old Alena Gnatyuk, a student of the Institute of Water Transport. The killer kidnapped her from the "Chyornaya Rechka" metro station, dragged her into the basement of a house on Kolomyazhsky Avenue, raped and strangled her.

On May 21, 2007, in the basement of a house on Bolshaya Raznochinnaya Street, he committed the last murder. The victim was 12-year-old Lena Boyko, with the modus operandi being the same - she was raped, followed by strangulation.

Arrest, investigation and trial 
According to the testimony of witnesses, a facial composite of the killer was drawn up. At the disposal of the authorities were recordings from external surveillance cameras at one of the murder sites. As a result, 863 people previously convicted for sexual crimes were tested. During the search, information was received about Voronenko. His address was traced, and on May 24, 2007, he was ambushed and arrested. At first he was suspected only in the last murder, but he subsequently confessed to the previous three. Forensic psychiatric examination recognized Voronenko as insane. The killer did not regret his deeds. These were Voronenko's last words at his trial: At the trial, the parents of the murdered girls and the prosecutor demanded the death penalty for Voronenko, but the court did not consider it possible to make such a verdict due to the moratorium on the death penalty, and on March 20, 2008, the St. Petersburg City Court sentenced him to life imprisonment. Relatives of the victims appealed to the Russian Supreme Court demanding the death penalty, but the verdict was left unchanged. Voronenko is currently serving his sentence in the "Polar Owl" penitentiary.

In the media 
 Documentary film Blood on the Neva, from the series Out of law.
 Documentary film To sentence to the highest measure from the series  directed by Vakhtang Mikeladze.
 Documentary Early release...for a maniac from the series , directed by Vakhtang Mikeladze.

See also
 List of Russian serial killers

References

External links 
 St.  Petersburg maniacs and serial killers (late 20th - early 21st centuries) (in Russian)

1971 births
Inmates of Kresty Prison
Kyrgyzstani emigrants to Russia
Kyrgyzstani emigrants to Ukraine
Kyrgyzstani serial killers
Living people
Male serial killers
Murderers of children
People convicted of child sexual abuse
Russian rapists
Soviet criminals
Ukrainian serial killers
Welders
Russian people convicted of murder
Ukrainian people convicted of murder